Stephanie Stahl Hamilton is an American politician and Presbyterian minister serving as a member of the Arizona House of Representatives for the 21st district. She was previously appointed to the Arizona Senate for the 10th district, and also served as a member of the Arizona House of Representatives from January to October 2021 for the 10th district.

Education 

Hamilton attended Eastern Nazarene College in Quincy, Massachusetts, where she received her Bachelor of Arts in Christian education in 1990. She later attended Princeton Theological Seminary, where she received her Master of Divinity in 2003.

Career 
Stephanie worked for Flagstaff Federated Community Church as the director of Christian Education and Youth Ministry.

She later went on to work at St. Mark's Presbyterian Church, PCUSA as the director of youth ministry in 2004. From 2009 to 2015, Hamilton worked at the Montlure Presbyterian Church Camp as the executive director. She has also served on multiple community-led organizations. She served on the Pima County Interfaith Council and on the TUSD Parent Advocacy Council, with her focus on the Family Life Curriculum. In 2018, Hamilton worked on the Save Our Schools campaign as the regional lead for Southern Arizona.

In October 2021, members of the Pima County Board of Supervisors appointed Stahl Hamilton to succeed Kirsten Engel in the Arizona Senate.

Elections

2020 
In the August primary, Hamilton ran for the 10th legislative district of the Arizona State House of Representatives. Hamilton and incumbent Domingo DeGrazia won the two seats, beating out candidate Paul Stapleton Smith. Stephanie Stahl Hamilton and Domingo DeGrazia won the general election, defeating Republican opponents, Mabelle Gummere and Michael Hicks.

References

External links 
 Profile at the Arizona Senate
 Campaign website

Year of birth missing (living people)
Living people
Democratic Party members of the Arizona House of Representatives
Eastern Nazarene College alumni
21st-century American politicians
21st-century American women politicians